ISO 15292, "Information technology – Security techniques – Protection Profile registration procedures" establishes an international registry (operated by AFNOR) for Protection Profiles and packages used in computer security evaluation under the Common Criteria framework. The format of these profiles and packages is as specified in ISO 15408.

ISO 15292 assigns registered Protection Profiles and packages labels of the form:
"Entry Type-registration Year-registration Number", for example PP-2003-0001.

External links 
 Link to ISO store page with the document, retrieved on August 9, 2008.

Computer security standards
15292